Sonneblom is a settlement in the remote East of Namibia in Omaheke Region, situated  from the regional capital Gobabis.

It belongs to the Otjombinde electoral constituency in the Kalahari Desert, near hunting grounds of the San people, who moved here long before the village was established. They still form the majority population of Donkerbos. Donkerbos Primary School serves 200 learners of both this settlement and the neighboring hamlet of Donkerbos.

Development and infrastructure
Sonneblom is outside the coverage of all mobile communication networks. It does not have electricity or landline telephone service and is not connected to Namibia's water and sewerage system. School and village share one borehole. The access road off D1692 is a bumpy  sand track only accessible by 4x4.

References

Populated places in the Omaheke Region